The siege of Krupa was fought on 3-23 June 1565 between the Ottoman forces of Mustafa Pasha Sokolović, Beylerbey of Livno, and the Germanic and Croatian forces led by Matija Bakić. The siege was a part of the Croatian–Ottoman wars and Ottoman–Habsburg wars between the Ottoman Empire and the Habsburg monarchy.

Prelude 
The death of Hungarian and Croatian king Ferdinand I of Habsburg in 1564, annihilated the Habsburg-Ottoman armistice signed in 1562 for the duration of nine years. As a pretext for a new campaign, Suleiman the Magnificent used the ongoing civil war in Hungary, between Transylvanian prince John Sigismund Zápolya (pretender for the crown of Hungary and Ottoman vassal) and Ferdinand's son and new king, Maximilian.

Siege

Krupa fortress 

Krupa castle (first mentioned in the 13th century), on a cliff above the river Una, had one large and two minor round towers connected with bulwarks. Under the castle was a large settlement, fortified with a wall with two towers (later adapted for artillery) and a gatehouse. Until 1456, it was the property of Croatian nobility, and after it passed to the king.

Former sieges 
After the fall of Bosnia in 1463, it became one of the foremost Croatian forts in the way of Ottoman raids towards Bihać which would also eventually fall in 1592. The first siege (in 1509) by 2,000 Ottomans was beaten back, as well as the 4-month siege in 1522-1523 (by 2,000 Ottoman cavalry and 5,000 infantry).

Final siege 
In 1565 as a prelude to a full-scale Ottoman-Habsburg war, Mustafa Pasha Sokolović, Beylerbey of Livno, attacked the Croatian frontier in the summer of 1565 and besieged Krupa fortress. A small garrison (only 28 men), led by Croatian nobleman Matija Bakić, resisted valiantly for 20 days. The last 8 defenders sallied out of the fort and fell, fighting the overwhelming Ottoman forces on 23 June 1565.

Aftermath 
Further intrusion into Croatia by Mustafa Pasha Sokolović were beaten back by Croatian ban Petar Erdody in the Battle of Obreška.

Bibliography
Vojna enciklopedija (1970–76), 10 volumes, Vojno izdavački zavod Beograd, book 1, p. 755, article Bosanska Krupa

References

Krupa
Krupa
Conflicts in 1565
Krupa